John Hunting (1935) is an English former football referee who operated in the Football League and for FIFA. During his time on the List he was based in Leicester, where he worked as a university lecturer.

Career
Hunting became a Football League referee at the age of only 32. Four years later he was senior linesman during the 1972 FA Cup Final, and it took only one more year for him to reach the FIFA List.

He refereed regularly abroad, including two European Championships qualifying games - the Netherlands against Switzerland on 28 March 1979, and the USSR versus Portugal on 27 April 1983. He also took charge of the FIFA World Cup qualifying match for the 1982 tournament between Nigeria and Tunisia on 12 July 1980.

Domestically, he was appointed to Home International Championship matches, such as the meeting between Northern Ireland and Scotland at Windsor Park, Belfast, on 28 April 1982.

His most senior European club game was the European Cup quarter-final second leg between Baník Ostrava and Bayern Munich in 1981. However, it was only at the very end of his career in 1984 that he was awarded the FA Cup Final. This was his farewell match, which took place at Wembley as Everton beat Watford 2–0.

Personal life
Outside football, Hunting is a freemason, one of five said to have refereed the FA Cup Final. He has also been an ITF Silver Badge tennis, and kerby referee.

References

Print

Football League Handbooks, 1968–1970
Rothmans Football Yearbooks, 1971–1984
Ionescu, Romeo (2003) The Complete Results & Line-Ups of the European Football Championships 1958–2003, Soccer Books Limited
Ionescu, Romeo (2004) The Complete Results & Line-Ups of the European Champions Clubs' Cup 1955–1991, Soccer Books Limited
Ionescu, Romeo (2004) The Complete Results & Line-Ups of the European Cup Winners Cup 1960–1999, Soccer Books Limited
Ionescu, Romeo (2004) The Complete Results & Line-Ups of the UEFA Cup 1971–1991, Soccer Books Limited.

Internet

1936 births
Sportspeople from Leicester
English football referees
FA Cup Final referees
Living people
English Football League referees